Brigitte Reichert (born 4 May 1946) is a German speed skater. She competed in two events at the 1964 Winter Olympics.

References

1946 births
Living people
German female speed skaters
Olympic speed skaters of the United Team of Germany
Speed skaters at the 1964 Winter Olympics
Speed skaters from Berlin